Katerynopil is an urban-type settlement located in Zvenyhorodka Raion, Cherkasy Oblast (province) in central Ukraine. It hosts the administration of Katerynopil settlement hromada, one of the hromadas of Ukraine. Population: 

Until 1795 it was a village and later a miasteczko of Kalnebłota, Kalnebłoto, Kalnyboloto),  and after parts of Poland were incorporated into the Russian Empire, in 1797 it was renamed to  Yekaterinopol after the Russian tsarina Catherine the Great.

Until 18 July 2020, Katerynopil served as an administrative center of Katerynopil Raion. The raion was abolished in July 2020 as part of the administrative reform of Ukraine, which reduced the number of raions of Cherkasy Oblast to four. The area of Katerynopil Raion was merged into Zvenyhorodka Raion.

Archaeologists have found remains of the ancient Trypillya culture on the territory of Katerynopil. During the Khmelnytsky Uprising in 1648–1654, Kalnyboloto was a sotnia town of the Korsun Cossack host.  On March 5, 1923, Katerynopil was given the status of an administrative center of its surrounding district.

People from Katerynopil
 Semen Hryzlo (c. 1887–1921), Ukrainian military and civil activist, organizer of the Free Cossacks
 Wolf Ladejinsky (1899–1975), a prominent American economist, mastermind of the land reform of 1946 in Japan
 Yuriy Kosiuk (born 1968), Ukrainian billionaire, CEO of MHP

References

External links
 

Urban-type settlements in Zvenyhorodka Raion
Populated places established in 1568
1568 establishments in Europe